Gaiola may refer to:

 Gaiola, a municipality in the Province of Cuneo, Italy
 Gaiola Island, an island in the Gulf of Naples, Italy
 Gaiola (construction), a Portuguese building technique
 Riccardo Gaiola, Italian footballer